The British Association of Symphonic Bands and Wind Ensembles is an organisation that represents symphonic bands and wind ensembles, also known as concert bands, in the UK.

History
It was founded in July 1981 by Timothy Reynish at a conference for symphonic bands and wind ensembles at the Royal Northern College of Music (RNCM) in Manchester.

Participation
Wind ensembles are often found at universities, and are more prevalent amongst younger people, who have more opportunity and encouragement to join like-minded musical people, e.g. at some schools. Older people would not be able, by definition, to join these bands. The existence of a wind band at a particular school is strongly associated with more successful schools. However a successful school need not have a wind band or orchestra.

Structure
It is partly funded by the PRS Foundation.

Members include:
 North Cheshire Wind Orchestra

Function
It publishes Winds Magazine and runs the BASBWE Education Trust, which was formed in April 1990 and registered as a charity in June 1990.

The charity funds young people to attend the Canford Summer School of Music BASBWE Wind Band Conductors Course.

External links
 BASBWE

Organizations established in 1981
Concert bands
Music charities based in the United Kingdom
Music organisations based in the United Kingdom
1981 establishments in the United Kingdom